The Russian occupation of Chernihiv Oblast was a military occupation that began on 24 February 2022, the start of the Russian invasion of Ukraine. Steadily, Russian troops started capturing large parts of the Chernihiv Oblast to try to take the capital city of Ukraine, Kyiv. The capital city of the oblast, Chernihiv, was never captured. By April 3, Russian forces left the oblast, ending the occupation.

Occupation

Chernihiv 
On 25 February 2022, Russian Ministry of Defense announced that Russian forces were laying siege to the city.  The following day, Ukrainian forces in the city claimed they defeated one of the units imposing siege. 

On 1 March, governor of Chernihiv Oblast, Vyacheslav Chaus claimed that every access point to the city was heavily mined.  

On 10 March, Mayor Vladyslav Atroshenko said that Russian forces had completed the encirclement of Chernihiv, adding that the city was completely isolated and critical infrastructure for its 300,000 residents was rapidly failing as it came under repeated bombardment. He also claimed that Russia attacked 7 civilians escaping through an evacuation convoy. A Russian airstrike also damaged the Chernihiv Arena. 

On 11 March, Ukrainian forces claimed to have destroyed a Russian missile unit shelling the city, with some Russian troops surrendering. 

On 25 March, Ukrainian authorities said that Russian forces had cut off the northern city of Chernihiv after destroying a road bridge across the Desna River in the south, while attempts to fully encircle the city remained unsuccessful.

On 31 March, the Ukrainian Army recaptured the M01 highway connecting Kyiv and Chernihiv, ending the siege. The Mayor reported the first quiet night since the war began. 

On 2 April, Ukraine recaptured the villages of Sloboda [uk] and Shestovytsia [uk] near Chernihiv.

Horodnia 
On 25 February 2022, Russia captured Horodnia, a city in the Chernihiv Raion and established their military headquarters there. Ukraine later retook the city on 2 April 2022.

Withdrawal by Russia 
On 30 March, Russia began withdrawing troops from Northern Ukraine, including Chernihiv Oblast.  Ukrainian forces started recapturing many towns and settlements and by 3 April, Ukrainian officials and the Pentagon claimed Russian forces left Chernihiv Oblast for redeployment in Donbas and South Ukraine.

Aftermath 
After Russian forces withdrew, Ukrainian forces began demining operations in the Kyiv and Chernihiv Oblasts.  

On August 9, the United States Department of State announced that it will send $89,000,000 to Ukraine to help with demining operations.  

Russian forces still shell small towns and villages near the border with Russia.

Control of cities

See also 
 Russian-occupied territories of Ukraine
 Russian occupation of Crimea
 Russian occupation of Donetsk Oblast
 Russian occupation of Kharkiv Oblast
 Russian occupation of Kherson Oblast
 Russian occupation of Kyiv Oblast
 Russian occupation of Luhansk Oblast
 Russian occupation of Mykolaiv Oblast
 Russian occupation of Sumy Oblast
 Russian occupation of Zaporizhzhia Oblast
 Russian occupation of Zhytomyr Oblast
 Snake Island during the 2022 Russian invasion of Ukraine
 Annexation of Crimea by the Russian Federation
 Russian annexation of Donetsk, Kherson, Luhansk and Zaporizhzhia oblasts

Notes

References 

Chernihiv
February 2022 events in Ukraine
March 2022 events in Ukraine
April 2022 events in Ukraine
Chernihiv
History of Chernihiv Oblast
Chernihiv